The National Ribat University (NRU) (Arabic: جامعة الرباط الوطني) is a university based in the city of Khartoum, Sudan.

The President of the Republic is the sponsor of the university.
The University Council is chaired by the Minister of Interior, and the Director General of Sudanese Police Forces is his deputy.
The university is ranked 10,402 in the world, third in Sudan. In Sudan, it ranks below the University of Khartoum and the Sudan University of Science and Technology, above Karary University and the International University of Africa.

The National Ribat University is one of the biggest universities in Sudan that offers a variety of programs Associate degree, Bachelor's degree and Master's degree. This university is partially affiliated with the Sudanese Police, whereas the students do not graduate with an official police ranking.

Academic departments 
Initially the university had three faculties: Police Sciences and Law, Medicine and Nursing Sciences. Since then additional faculties have been added. The National Ribat University currently contains 18 faculties, 3 centers and 2 institutes.

Faculties

 Police Higher Academy (1925)
 Faculty of Police Science and Law
 Faculty of Medicine (2000)
 Faculty of Dentistry (2001)
 Faculty Of Pharmacy (2001)
 Faculty of Medical Laboratory Science (2000)
 Faculty of Radiology and Nuclear Medicine (2001)
 Faculty of Nursing (2000)
 Faculty of Architecture (2010)
 Faculty of Economic, Administrative and Financial Sciences (2005)
 Faculty of Computer Studies (2001)
 Faculty of Technology and Health Science (2005)
 Faculty of Law (2013)
 Faculty of Language and Translation (2005)
 Faculty of Media (2010)
 Faculty of Environmental Studies and Disaster Management (2001)
 Abdusalam Elkhabir Faculty for Islamic and Quranic Studies (1999)
 Faculty of Graduate Studies and Research (2001)

Centers

 Poisons Center
 Strategic Studies Center
 Center of  Elsharif Zain Alabidin Elhindi for Strategic and Security Studies (2001)

Institutes

 Researches Institute of Criminal and Social Studies
 Institute of Forensic Evidence Science

See also 
 University of Khartoum
 Sudan University of Science and Technology
 University of al-Jazirah
 The Future University (Sudan)
 Ahfad University for Women
 List of universities in Sudan
 Education in Sudan
 Sudanese Universities Information Network

References

External links 
University Official Website
Ministry Of Higher Education

Universities and colleges in Sudan
Educational institutions established in 2000
2000 establishments in Sudan